Victor Andrés Trelles Turgeon, sometimes credited as Victor Trelles, is a Canadian actor from Quebec. He is most noted for his performance in the 2012 film The Torrent (Le Torrent), for which he received a Prix Jutra nomination for Best Actor at the 15th Jutra Awards in 2013.

Career 
Turgeon has also appeared in the films The Wild Hunt, For the Love of God (Pour l'amour de Dieu), Mesnak, Henri Henri, Touched and Jouliks, and the television series La Marraine, Fatale-Station, Bellevue, The Forbidden Room, Victor Lessard, Deadly Class and Fortunate Son.

Personal life 
Turgeon is of partial Peruvian descent.

Filmography

Film

Television

References

External links

21st-century Canadian male actors
Canadian male television actors
Canadian male film actors
Male actors from Quebec
Canadian people of Peruvian descent
Living people
Year of birth missing (living people)